The 2019–20 Central Arkansas Bears basketball team represented the University of Central Arkansas in the 2019–20 NCAA Division I men's basketball season. The Bears were led by interim head coach Anthony Boone, who took over for then sixth-year head coach Russ Pennell following Pennell's resignation on January 7, and played their home games at the Farris Center in Conway, Arkansas as members of the Southland Conference. They finished the season 10–21, 9–11 in Southland play to finish in ninth place. They failed to qualify for the Southland Conference tournament.

Previous season
The Bears finished the 2018–19 season 14–19 overall, 8–10 in Southland play, to finish in a tie for seventh place. In the Southland tournament, they defeated Texas A&M–Corpus Christi in the first round, before being defeated by Southeastern Louisiana in the second round.

Roster

Schedule and results

|-
!colspan=12 style=| Exhibition

|-
!colspan=12 style=| Regular season

|-

Source

See also 
2019–20 Central Arkansas Sugar Bears basketball team

References

Central Arkansas Bears basketball seasons
Central Arkansas Bears
Central Arkansas Bears basketball
Central Arkansas Bears basketball